Macropharyngodon ornatus, the false leopard or the ornate leopard wrasse, is a species of marine ray-finned fish from the family Labridae, the wrasses. It is found from Sri Lanka to western Australia, including Indonesia, although records from New Ginea have not been verified. Its diet consists of small benthic animals. M. ornatus is collected for the aquarium trade.

References

External links
 

Fish of Thailand
ornatus
Fish described in 1978
Taxa named by John Ernest Randall